Dyspessa infuscata is a species of moth of the family Cossidae. It is found in Russia, Ukraine and the Near East (Syria and Turkey).

The wingspan is 19–21 mm. The wings are uniform dark brownish grey.

References

Moths described in 1892
Dyspessa
Moths of Asia
Moths of Europe